Mohammad Sattarpour (born May 22, 1988 in Tehran) is an amateur boxer from Iran who competed in the Welterweight (-69 kg) division at the 2006 Asian Games winning the bronze medal in a lost bout in the semifinals against Thailand's eventual silver medalist Angkhan Chomphuphuang 18-36. During the 2010 Asian Games in Guangzhou, he reached the semifinals but eventually lost against India's Vijender Singh after putting up a fierce fight in a close bout of 10-7. He won a Bronze medal.

References

1988 births
Living people
Boxers at the 2010 Asian Games
Asian Games bronze medalists for Iran
Asian Games medalists in boxing
Boxers at the 2006 Asian Games
Iranian male boxers
Medalists at the 2006 Asian Games
Medalists at the 2010 Asian Games
Welterweight boxers
21st-century Iranian people
20th-century Iranian people